Dhaulagiri is the seventh highest mountain in the world at  above sea level, and the highest mountain within the borders of a single country (Nepal). It was first climbed on 13 May 1960 by a Swiss-Austrian-Nepali expedition.
The Kali Gandaki River flows between the two in the Kaligandaki Gorge, said to be the world's deepest. The town of Pokhara is south of the Annapurnas, an important regional center and the gateway for climbers and trekkers visiting both ranges as well as a tourist destination in its own right.

Toponymy 
Dhaulagiri (धौलागिरी) is the Nepali name for the mountain which comes from Sanskrit where धवल (dhawala) means dazzling, white, beautiful and गिरि (giri) means mountain.  Dhaulagiri I is also the highest point of the Gandaki river basin.

Geography
Looking north from the plains of India, most 8,000-metre peaks are obscured by nearer mountains, but in clear weather, Dhaulagiri is conspicuous from northern Bihar and as far south as Gorakhpur in Uttar Pradesh. In 1808, survey computations showed it to be the highest mountain yet surveyed. This lasted until 1838 when Kangchenjunga took its place, followed by Mount Everest in 1858.

Dhaulagiri I's sudden rise from lower terrain is almost unequaled. It rises  from the Kali Gandaki River 30 km to the southeast. The south face of Gurja Himal in the same massif is also notably immense.

Climbing history

Most ascents have followed the northeast ridge route of the first ascent, but climbs have been made from most directions. As of 2007, there had been 358 successful ascents and 58 fatalities, which is a summit to a fatality rate of 16.2%.
Between 1950 and 2006, 2.88% of 2,016 expedition members and staff going above base camp on Dhaulagiri I died.  On all 8,000 metre peaks in Nepal the death rate was 1.63%, ranging from 0.65% on Cho Oyu to 4.04% on Annapurna I and 3.05% on Manaslu.

Partial timeline
 1950 – Dhaulagiri I reconnoitered by a French expedition led by Maurice Herzog.  They do not see a feasible route and switch to Annapurna, where they make the first ascent of an 8000 m peak.
 1953–1958 – Five expeditions attempt the north face, or "Pear Buttress", route.
 1959 – Austrian expedition led by Fritz Moravec makes the first attempt on the northeast ridge.
 1960 – Swiss-Austrian expedition led by Max Eiselin, successful ascent by Kurt Diemberger, Peter Diener, Ernst Forrer, Albin Schelbert, Nyima Dorje Sherpa, Nawang Dorje Sherpa on 13 May. First Himalayan climb supported by the first prototype fixed-wing aircraft, which, after establishing the still standing record for highest fixed wing landing, eventually crashed in Hidden Valley north of the mountain during takeoff and was abandoned.
 1969 – American team led by Boyd Everett attempt southeast ridge; seven team members, including Everett, were killed in an avalanche.
 1970 – The second ascent, via the northeast ridge by a Japanese expedition led by Tokufu Ohta and Shoji Imanari. Tetsuji Kawada and Lhakpa Tenzing Sherpa reach the summit.
 1973 – American team led by James D. Morrissey makes the third ascent via the northeast ridge. Summit team: John Roskelley, Louis Reichardt, and Nawang Samden Sherpa.
 1975 – Japanese team led by Takashi Amemiya attempts southwest ridge (also known as the south pillar). Six are killed in an avalanche, including Norio Suzuki.
 1976 – Italian expedition makes the fourth ascent.
 1977 – International team led by Reinhold Messner attempts the south face.
 1978, spring: Amemiya returns with an expedition that puts five members on the summit via the southwest ridge—the first ascent not using the northeast ridge. One team member dies during the ascent.
 1978, autumn – Seiko Tanaka of Japan leads successful climb of the very difficult southeast ridge. Four are killed during the ascent. French team attempts the southwest buttress (also called the "south buttress"), only reaches 7,200 m.
 1980 – A four-man team consisting of Polish climbers Voytek Kurtyka, Ludwik Wiczyczynski, Frenchman René Ghilini, and Scotsman Alex MacIntyre climb the east face, topping out at 7,500 m on the northeast ridge. After a bivouac, they descend back to base camp in a storm. One week later they climb the mountain via the northeast ridge reaching the summit on 18 May.
 1981 – Yugoslav team reaches 7,950 m after putting up the first route on the true south face of the mountain, on the right side, connecting with the southeast ridge. They climb in alpine style but suffer four days of open bivouacs and six days without food before returning. Hironobu Kamuro of Japan reaches the summit alone, via the normal route.
 1982, 5 May – Three members – Philip Cornelissen, Rudi Van Snick, and Ang Rita Sherpa – of a Belgian-Nepali team reach the summit via the north-east ridge. A day later, four more climbers – Ang Jangbu Sherpa, Marnix Lefever, Lut Vivijs, and Jan Vanhees – summit also. Vivijs becomes the first woman to reach the summit.
1982, 13 December – Two members (Akio Koizumi and Wangchu Shelpa) of the Japanese team led by Jun Arima of the Academic Alpine Club of Hokkaido University reach the summit. By the world calendar, winter begins 21 December, so this was not winter but a very-late-autumn-climb. However, the climb was done under a winter climbing permit, which the Nepali government issues for climbs beginning on or after 1 December.
 1984 – Three members of the Czechoslovakian expedition (Jan Simon, Karel Jakes, Jaromir Stejskal) climb the west face to the summit. Simon died during the descent.
 1985 – Polish expedition led by Adam Bilczewski set out to conquer Dhaulagiri for the first time in winter. After seven weeks of dramatic struggle against hurricane-force winds and temperatures below −40c°, Andrzej Czok and Jerzy Kukuczka successfully made first winter ascent on 21 January.
 1986 – A mostly Polish expedition puts up a second south face route, on the left side of the face connecting with the southwest ridge route. They go above 7,500 m but do not reach the summit.
 1988 – Soviet mountaineers Yuri Moiseev and Kazbek Valiev, in cooperation with Zoltan Demján of Czechoslovakia, succeed in climbing the southwest buttress. This 3,000-metre ascent, with difficult technical climbing at 6,800–7,300 m, was acknowledged as the year's best achievement at the UIAA Expedition Commission Conference.
1993 – Russian-British team puts up the direct north face route.
1995 — Anatoli Boukreev,  speed ascent, record time 17 hours 15 mins, base camp to summit.
 1998 – French climber Chantal Mauduit and Sherpa Ang Tshering die when an avalanche strikes their tent on the Northeast Ridge. On 1 May the Greek climber Nikolaos Papandreou is killed falling in a gorge. On 2 October, the Greek Babis Tsoupras reaches the summit but does not return. The bodies of the Greek climbers were not found.
 1999 – On 24 October, British climber Ginette Harrison dies in an avalanche on Dhaulagiri. Days later, Slovenian Tomaž Humar climbs the south face solo but does not reach the summit. His ascent ended at 7,300 m due to a 300 m band of rotten rock. Humar traverses to the dangerous southeast ridge, re-enters the face briefly, and exits at 8000 m for a descent on the northeast ridge. Dhaulagiri's south face is still unclimbed, making it one of the greatest remaining challenges in alpinism.

References
 
 
 
 
 
 

Notes

Sources
 American Alpine Journal, 1974, 1976, 1977, 1979, 1986, 1987, 1994, 1999, 2000.
 Eiselin, Max, The Ascent of Dhaulagiri, OUP, 1961
 
 Himalayan Index

External links

 Dhaulagiri Expedition 
 Dhaulagiri on Himalaya-Info.org (German)
 
 Dhaulagiri on summitpost.org (Detailed description of trekking and of first ascent)
 Himalayan Index

Eight-thousanders of the Himalayas
Mountains of the Gandaki Province